Lycia lapponaria, the Rannoch brindled beauty, is a moth of the family Geometridae. It is found in most of the northern part of the Palearctic realm, including Scotland.

The wingspan is 26–34 mm for males. Females are wingless. The males have whitish forewings marked with black and both sexes have red markings on the thorax and abdomen. Adult males are on wing from March to April in the south and from May to mid June in the north. There is one generation per year.

The larvae feed on Betula nana, Myrica gale and Calluna vulgaris. Larvae can be found in July. It overwinters as a pupa.

Subspecies
Lycia lapponaria lapponaria
Lycia lapponaria scotica (Harrison, 1916) (Scotland)

References

External links
UKmoths

Bistonini
Moths of Europe
Moths described in 1840